KNFR is a Christian radio station licensed to Gravel Ridge, Arkansas, broadcasting on 90.9 MHz FM.  The station serves the northeastern Little Rock Metropolitan Area, and is owned by Fellowship Christian Church.

References

External links
KNFR's official website

NFR